Caladenia lobata, commonly known as the butterfly orchid, is a species of orchid endemic to the south-west of Western Australia. It has a single, hairy leaf and one or two greenish-yellow flowers with red markings which have a labellum which vibrates in the slightest breeze.

Description 
One or two greenish-yellow flowers with red markings are borne on a hairy spike . The labellum is delicately hinged so that it vibrates in the slightest breeze. Flowering is from late September to November.

Taxonomy and naming 
Caladenia lobata was first described by Robert D. FitzGerald in 1882 in The Gardeners' Chronicle, in which he describes the species as "A tall robust species, probably the tallest in the genus. From 1 foot 6 inches to 2 feet, hairy." The specific epithet (lobata) is a Latin word meaning "lobed", referring to the broad lobes of the labellum.

Distribution and habitat 
The butterfly orchid usually grows in dense, shrubby forest in well-drained grey sand, gravelly or clayey loam, or laterite, frequently on flats and slopes near streams. It is found between Bunbury and the Stirling Range in the Esperance Plains, Jarrah Forest and Swan Coastal Plain biogeographical regions of Western Australia.

References 

lobata
Orchids of Western Australia
Endemic orchids of Australia
Plants described in 1882
Endemic flora of Western Australia